David Chapman may refer to:

David Chapman (journalist) (born 1976), writer/producer covering video games, comic books, and other pop culture interests
David Chapman (chemist) (1869–1958), English physical chemist
David Chapman (cricketer) (1855–1934), former first-class cricketer
David C. Chapman (1876–1944), led initiative to create the Great Smoky Mountains National Park
David Chapman (handballer) (1975–2017), American handball player
Dave Chapman (athlete) (born 1936), British steeplechase runner
Dave Chapman (actor) (born 1973), English actor and television presenter
Mark David Chapman (born 1955), murderer of John Lennon
David Chapman (sport shooter) (born 1965), Australian rapid fire pistol shooter
David Chapman (British sport shooter) (born 1963), British sports shooter
Sir David Chapman, 3rd Baronet (born 1941), British investment banker
David Chapman (American hotelier), owner of Cataract House in Niagara Falls, New York
David Chapman (physicist) (born 1953), Canadian physicist after whom asteroid 10047 Davidchapman was named